The Embassy of Kosovo in London is the diplomatic mission of Kosovo in the United Kingdom. It is located at 8 John Street, London, WC1N 2EB. The embassy is also accredited to the Republic of Ireland.

Gallery

See also
Embassy of the United Kingdom, Pristina
 Kosovo–United Kingdom relations
 List of diplomatic missions of Kosovo
 List of diplomatic missions in the United Kingdom

References

External links
Official site

Kosovo
Diplomatic missions of Kosovo
Kosovo–United Kingdom relations
Ireland–Kosovo relations